The 1983 LPGA Tour was the 34th season since the LPGA Tour officially began in 1950. The season ran from January 27 to November 13. The season consisted of 33 official money events. Pat Bradley and Patty Sheehan won the most tournaments, four each. JoAnne Carner led the money list with earnings of $291,404.

There were nine first-time winners in 1983: Lynn Adams, Lauren Howe, Juli Inkster, Alice Miller, Lenore Muraoka, Anne Marie Palli, Lauri Peterson, Kathy Postlewait, and Patti Rizzo. This was the first year that the Nabisco Dinah Shore (now called the Kraft Nabisco Championship) was classified as an LPGA major.

The tournament results and award winners are listed below.

Tournament results
The following table shows all the official money events for the 1983 season. "Date" is the ending date of the tournament. The numbers in parentheses after the winners' names are the number of wins they had on the tour up to and including that event. Majors are shown in bold.

Awards

References

External links
LPGA Tour official site
1983 season coverage at golfobserver.com

LPGA Tour seasons
LPGA Tour